Jean-Baptiste Boyer-Fonfrède (1760 – 31 October 1793) was a French Girondin politician.

A deputy to the National Convention from his native city, Bordeaux, he voted for the death of Louis XVI, denounced the September Massacres and accused Jean-Paul Marat. He was tried, condemned, and guillotined in Paris with the leading Girondin deputies on 31 October 1793.

His son Henri Fonfrède (1788–1841) made his name as a publicist defending liberal ideas in Bordeaux's main newspaper under the Bourbon Restoration.

In literature 
Boyer-Fonfrède, together with his best friend, fellow deputy Jean-François Ducos, appears in a supporting role in the historical mystery novel Palace of Justice (2010) by Susanne Alleyn.

1760 births
1793 deaths
Politicians from Bordeaux
Girondins
Deputies to the French National Convention
Presidents of the National Convention
Regicides of Louis XVI
People executed by the French First Republic
French people executed by guillotine during the French Revolution
Executed people from Aquitaine